The Seki River (関川) is a river in Niigata Prefecture and Nagano Prefecture, Japan.

References

Rivers of Niigata Prefecture
Rivers of Nagano Prefecture
Rivers of Japan